Thomas Staunton may refer to:

 Thomas Staunton (Nottinghamshire MP), MP for Nottinghamshire 1411
 Thomas Staunton (Ipswich MP), MP for Ipswich 1757–84

See also 
 Staunton (surname)